Wills Point is a city in Van Zandt County, Texas, United States. The population was 3,524 at the 2010 census.

History
Founded in 1873, Wills Point gets its name from an early American settler, William Wills, who had arrived in the area circa 1848. Wills eventually purchased a cabin from Adam Sullivan in 1852. The name 'point' may also derive from the shape of the original timberline near the cabin, though there have been unsubstantiated arguments that the name relates to the area's elevation. The layout of the city was the work of engineer General Grenville M. Dodge of the California Construction Company. The downtown streets were laid with red bricks upon packed sand in the 1920s by locals and remain in use. Downtown Wills Point has many of its original buildings that are over one hundred years old including the Wills cabin, a drug store, a dry good store, and a law office. Governor George W. Bush officially named Wills Point the Bluebird Capital of Texas in 1995.

The Majestic Movie theater was opened in 1926 by Karl C. LyBrand and was still family operated by Karl C. Lybrand III until its closure on October 4, 2010. It had been the oldest continuously operated movie theater in Texas run by a single family.
The Bruce & Human Drug Company, located on the corner of 4th Street and James, was built in 1879 and is the oldest family owned drug store in Texas.

Wills Point is also the final resting place for Trailblazer, the first commercially operated monorail system in the United States.

Gospel For Asia, a Christian ministry which has faced numerous lawsuits alleging misuse of donations, is located seven miles outside the city.

Geography

Wills Point is located at  (32.708622, –96.006512).

According to the United States Census Bureau, the city has a total area of 3.6 square miles (9.3 km), all land.

Climate

The climate in this area is characterized by hot, humid summers and generally mild to cool winters.  According to the Köppen climate classification system, Wills Point has a humid subtropical climate, Cfa on climate maps.

Demographics

As of the 2020 United States census, there were 3,747 people, 1,350 households, and 945 families residing in the city.

Education 

Wills Point and the surrounding unincorporated areas are served by the Wills Point ISD. It is administered by Superintendent Scott Caloss. As of 2006, there are five schools: Wills Point Primary School (Pre-K through 1st grades), E.O. Woods Intermediate School (2nd–4th), Wills Point Middle School (5th–6th), Wills Point Jr. High (7th–8th), and Wills Point High School (9th–12th). The Wills Point High School Tigers football team won the 1A State Championship in 1965.

Photo gallery

Transportation

Major highways 
 U.S. Highway 80
 State Highway 64

Airports 
The city owns Van Zandt County Regional Airport, which was known as Wills Point Municipal Airport prior to the 2007 approval of a major airport improvement project.

References

External links

 City of Wills Point Texas
 WillsPoint.com
 KWJB RADIO the official website of the only broadcasting station in Van Zandt County
 Wills Point Chronicle
 Wills Point ISD

Cities in Van Zandt County, Texas
Cities in Texas
Populated places established in 1873